A constitutional referendum was held in Haiti on 22 July 1985. The amendments to the new constitution would restore multi-party politics, although only on the condition that all parties swore allegiance to President Jean-Claude Duvalier, as well as re-confirming Duvalier as President for Life and allowing him to single-handedly appoint the Prime Minister and his successor. The changes were reportedly approved by 99.98% of voters, although it was widely considered a sham and led to Duvalier being overthrown the following year.

Results

References

1985 in Haiti
1985 referendums
Initiatives and referendums in Haiti
Constitutional referendums in Haiti
July 1985 events in North America